Three icebreaking ships have been named Sibir:

 , a Soviet icebreaker launched in 1937 as I. Stalin and later renamed
 , a Soviet Arktika-class nuclear-powered icebreaker in service from 1977 until 1992
 , a Russian Project 22220 icebreaker which entered service in 2021

Ship names